Marble is an unincorporated community and census-designated place (CDP) in Cherokee County, North Carolina, United States. As of the 2010 census it had a population of 321.

History

Indigenous peoples

Before settlement, Cherokee County was home to the Cherokee people, Native Americans that made their home in what are now the southeastern United States (principally Georgia, the Carolinas and eastern Tennessee). They were considered one of the "Five Civilized Tribes" because of their assimilation of European-American cultural and technological practices. This is the origin of the county's name.

County formation
In 1791, Colonel David Vance and General William Lee Davidson presented a petition to the North Carolina House of Commons "that part of Burke County lying west of the Appalachian Mountains praying that a part of said county, and part of Rutherford County, be made into a separate and distinct county." Originally, the bill to create the county had the name "Union", but was changed to "Buncombe" in honor of Col. Edward Buncombe, a Revolutionary War hero from Tyrell County. The bill was ratified on January 14, 1792. The new county included most of western North Carolina and was so large it was commonly referred to it as the "State of Buncombe". Approximately 1,000 people lived in the county.

In 1808, the western portion of Buncombe County was separated to form Haywood County. The bill, introduced by General Thomas Love, became law on December 23, 1808, and was official in March 1809.

In 1838, Macon County was formed from the western side of Haywood County. In 1849, Cherokee County was split from Macon County.

Origin of name
Marble got its name from various marble quarries in the community. Currently, none are functioning, and all have filled with water.

Law enforcement
Marble is served by the town of Andrews Police Department.

Crime data
According to the 2012 Crime Rate Index, Marble was rated a rape crime risk of 131 and a murder crime risk of 111. Marble also scored 81 for vehicle theft and 58 for larceny. All scores are compared to a national average of 100. North Carolina average is 103. With a population of only 321, one event can exaggerate numbers dramatically.

Demographics

As of the 2010 Census, there were 321 people, of which 162 were male and 159 were female. The 2010 population density was 293 people per square mile.

Economy

Occupations
19.1% of individuals over the age of 16, are employed in management or professional industries. 19.1% are employed in the service industry, 16.9% are employed in sales or office industries, 14.9% are employed in construction, extraction and maintenance while the remaining 28.3% are employed in production and transportation.

As of 2000, 12.3% of people were below the poverty line.

Household income
7.5% make less than $10,000 per year. 11.4% make between $10,000 and $14,999. 27.3% make between $15,000 and $24,999 per year. 14.2% make between $50,000 and $74,999 per year and 24.5% make between $35,000 and $49,999 per year. 14.2% make between $50,000 and $74,999 per year while the remaining 3.6% make over $75,000 per year.

As of 2000, 1.7% of Marble individuals were unemployed, while median household income was $28,553.

Education

Schools and colleges
Marble is in close proximity to Tri-County Community College which has campuses in Hayesville, Murphy, and Brasstown.

Public education

The public school system (Cherokee County Schools) is run by the Cherokee County Board of Education.

Children in Marble attended Marble Elementary School at 2230 Airport Road until 2017. This school covered grades pre-K to 5th grade and was given a GreatSchools rating of 3/10.

Since 2017 students from Marble attend Andrews Elementary, Middle and High School in the town of Andrews. As of 2016, the schools both scored 4/10 on GreatSchools.

Transportation

Highways
Marble sits on US 19/129/74, which runs northeast-southwest between Andrews and Murphy. Slow Creek Road (141) runs south toward the Murphy Medical Center in Peachtree.

Airport

Geography

Topography
Marble is located in the southeastern United States in the far western portion of North Carolina, approximately halfway between Atlanta, Georgia and Knoxville, Tennessee. The location in the Blue Ridge Mountains has helped the community retain a rural character, surrounded by wildlife such as bear, deer, and recently reintroduced elk.

Climate
Marble has a humid subtropical climate, (Cfa) according to the Köppen classification, with hot, humid summers and mild, but occasionally cold winters by the standards of the southern United States.

July highs average 85 °F (29 °C) or above, and lows average 55 °F (12.8 °C). Infrequently, temperatures can even exceed 100 °F (38 °C). January is the coldest month, with an average high of 48 °F (9 °C), and low of 33 °F (.6 °C).

Like the rest of the southeastern U.S., Marble receives abundant rainfall, which is relatively evenly distributed throughout the year. Average annual rainfall is 55.9 inches (1,420 mm). Blizzards are rare but possible; one nicknamed the 1993 Storm of the Century hit the entire Eastern United States in March 1993.

Culture
Situated in the midst of the Appalachian Mountains, Marble has a rich heritage, rural character and a colorful population.

Local festivals and celebrations
There are many vendors that sell food, drink, and other festivities.

Religion
Historically, religion has been a very important part of Appalachian life. Christianity is predominant in Marble and the surrounding communities. Baptist Christian faiths are well represented here. Some local churches are Marble Springs Baptist Church, Emanuel Baptist Church, Fair-view Church and Kingdom Hall-Jehovah's Witness.

Media
Marble and the surrounding area are served by a few local television stations, numerous local radio stations that broadcast several genres of music, sports, news and talk radio, plus three local newspapers.

A local television station is W31AN (Channel 31) based in Murphy.

Marble is served by eight local radio stations. WCVP-AM (600), WCNG-FM (102.7), and WKRK-AM (1320) are based in Murphy. WCVP-FM (95.9) is in Robbinsville, and WFSC-AM (1050), WPFJ-AM (1480), WFQS-FM (91.3), and WNCC (96.7) are based in Franklin.

The most important newspaper in Cherokee County is the Cherokee Scout which, in addition to Cherokee County, covers Clay County, North Carolina, and Towns County, Georgia. Two other notable newspapers are the Clay County Progress and the Towns County Herald.

Notable people
Roger West, local politician

Nearby communities 
Andrews ( northeast) 
Murphy ( southwest)

References

Populated places on the Valley River
Census-designated places in Cherokee County, North Carolina
Census-designated places in North Carolina